Arefaine Berhe has been the Minister of Agriculture of Eritrea since Tesfai Ghirmazion was moved to the Ministry of Land, Water, and Environment in February 1997.

References

External links
Image (Berhe on right)

Living people
Year of birth missing (living people)
People's Front for Democracy and Justice politicians
Government ministers of Eritrea